AFT is an album by pianist Joanne Brackeen recorded in late 1977 and released on the Dutch Timeless label.

Reception 

AllMusic reviewer Scott Yanow stated:

Track listing 
All compositions by Joanne Brackeen except where noted.

 "Haiti B" – 7:35
 "Charlotte's Dream" (Clint Houston) – 5:04
 "Dreamers" – 5:31
 "AFT" – 6:28
 "Winter Is Here" (Ryo Kawasaki) – 7:31
 "Green Voices of Play Air" – 9:09

Personnel 
Joanne Brackeen – piano
Ryo Kawasaki – guitar
Clint Houston – bass

References 

Joanne Brackeen albums
1978 albums
Timeless Records albums